Wiktor Litwiński was the President of Warsaw.

Mayors of Warsaw
Government officials of Congress Poland